Luis Avelino Ceballos Bustos (born 20 September 1964) is a Chilean former professional footballer who played as a midfielder and manager.

Club career
With an extensive career in Chilean football, in the Chilean Primera División Ceballos played for Fernández Vial, Cobreloa, O'Higgins, Colo-Colo, Universidad Católica, Deportes La Serena and Huachipato. In the Primera B de Chile, he played for Lota Schwager, Everton and Fernández Vial, where he retired.

He also had a stint with Colombian club Independiente Santa Fe in 1994, becoming the third Chilean to play for the club after Carlos Molina and Juan Ramón Garrido.

He won league titles along with Lota Schwager (1986, Segunda División), Cobreloa (1988, Primera División), and Everton (2003, Primera B). In addition he won the Copa Chile along with Colo-Colo (1994) and Universidad Católica (1995).

International career
Ceballos represented Chile in the 1987 Pan American Games, winning the silver medal.

Coaching career
He has coached Fernández Vial and Naval in the Primera B de Chile. In 2020, he assumed as coach of Malleco Unido in the Chilean Tercera B.

He also has worked with youth players in both the Lota Schwager youth system and his football academy in his city of birth.

Personal life
His younger brother, Sergio, is also a former footballer who played for Universidad de Chile while he was a player of Colo-Colo, the traditional rival.

He served as councillor of his city of birth, Lota from 2012 to 2016. In 2016 he was a mayoral candidate for the same city, as member of Amplitude party, but he wasn't elected.

Honours
Lota Schwager
 Segunda División: 1986

Cobreloa
 Primera División: 1988

Colo-Colo
 Copa Chile: 1994

Universidad Católica
 Copa Chile: 1995

Everton
 Primera B: 2003

Chile
 Pan American Games Silver medal: 1987

References

External links
 
 
 Luis Ceballos at playmakerstats.com (English version of ceroacero.es)

1964 births
Living people
People from Lota, Chile
Chilean footballers
Chilean expatriate footballers
Chile international footballers
Lota Schwager footballers
C.D. Arturo Fernández Vial footballers
Cobreloa footballers
O'Higgins F.C. footballers
Colo-Colo footballers
Independiente Santa Fe footballers
Club Deportivo Universidad Católica footballers
Deportes La Serena footballers
C.D. Huachipato footballers
Everton de Viña del Mar footballers
Primera B de Chile players
Chilean Primera División players
Categoría Primera A players
Association football midfielders
Chilean football managers
Arturo Fernández Vial managers
Deportes Naval managers
Primera B de Chile managers
Chilean expatriate sportspeople in Colombia
Expatriate footballers in Colombia
Chilean politicians
Chilean sportsperson-politicians
21st-century Chilean politicians
Amplitude (political party) politicians